This is a list of School of Oriental and African Studies people, including alumni, former and current members of staff. The School of Oriental and African Studies (SOAS) at the University of London has many notable alumni in positions of authority around the world. The university is particularly well known for educating royalty, diplomats and academics.

Royalty and nobility

Prince Mateen of Brunei – member of the Bruneian royal family
Princess Wijdan Ali of Jordan
Anthony Brooke, Rajah Muda of Sarawak
Princess Maria Laura of Belgium, Archduchess of Austria-Este
Mette-Marit, Crown Princess of Norway
Princess Muzna bint Ghalib Al Qu'aiti
Sultan Salahuddin, King of Malaysia 1999–2001
Chaitanya Raj Singh, titular Maharawal of Jaisalmer
 Abdulaziz bin Turki al Faisal – Grandson of King Faisal of Saudi Arabia
 Princess Lalla Oulaya Benharbit - Granddaughter of King Mohammed VI of Morocco
 Milo Arthur Johnson - Eldest Son of British Prime Minister Boris Johnson

Government and politics

Aung San Suu Kyi, Nobel Peace Prize Laureate and Member of the Burmese Parliament
Luisa Diogo, former Prime Minister of Mozambique
Bisher Al-Khasawneh, current Prime Minister of Jordan
Bülent Ecevit, former Prime Minister of Turkey
John Atta Mills, former President of Ghana
Hammad Azhar, Pakistani Barrister and former Finance minister of Pakistan
Mohamed Jameel Ahmed, fourth Vice President of the Maldives
Francis K. Butagira, Ambassador and Permanent Representative, Mission of the Republic of Uganda to the United Nations
Hugh Carless, UK Ambassador to Venezuela
Johnnie Carson, US Assistant Secretary of State for African Affairs and former US Ambassador to Kenya, Zimbabwe and Uganda
Hüseyin Çelik, Turkish Minister of Education and Member of Parliament
Kraisak Choonhavan, former Senator in the Senate of Thailand
Herbert Chitepo, first Black Rhodesian barrister
Femi Fani-Kayode, former Minister of Culture and Tourism and former Minister of Aviation in Nigeria
Sir Leslie Fielding, former British diplomat
Shreela Flather, Baroness Flather, teacher, politician
David Hannay, Baron Hannay of Chiswick, British diplomat
Lord Jay of Ewelme, civil servant
Zairil Khir Johari, Member of the Malaysian Parliament
Jemima Khan, UK Ambassador to UNICEF
Idris Kutigi, Chief Justice of the Supreme Court of Nigeria
David Lammy, Member of the British Parliament and former minister
Gunapala Malalasekera, Sri Lankan Ambassador to UK, Canada and Soviet Union
Sir Robin McLaren, UK Ambassador to China and the Philippines
Emma McCune, British foreign aid worker

Dan Mokonyane, South African activist
Maajid Nawaz, co-founder and Executive Director of Quilliam, the world's first counter-extremism think tank
Samia Nkrumah, Ghanaian Member of Parliament
Sylvester Umaru Onu, Judge of the Supreme Court of Nigeria
Aaron Mike Oquaye, Minister of Communication in Ghana
Amal Pepple, Minister of Housing, Lands and Urban Development in Nigeria and former Head of the Nigerian Civil Service
Enoch Powell, British politician
Quinton Quayle, UK Ambassador to the Kingdom of Thailand and to Lao People's Democratic Republic
Atiur Rahman, Governor of Central Bank, Bangladesh
Sir Shridath Ramphal, Secretary-General for the Commonwealth
Walter Rodney, historian and Guyanese political activist
Gita Sahgal, writer and journalist, film director, and human rights activist
Alan Senitt, political activist for homosexual rights
Ivor Stanbrook, Member of the British Parliament and diplomat
Hassan Taqizadeh, Member of Iranian Parliament and diplomat
Sir John Vinelott, lawyer and judge
Chris Trott, Ambassador to the Holy See
Sir David Warren, former UK Ambassador to Japan
Sir Michael Weir, former UK ambassador to Egypt
Catherine West, Member of British Parliament
Sir Ray Whitney, Member of British Parliament
Michael C Williams, UN Special Coordinator for Lebanon
David Wilson, Baron Wilson of Tillyorn, 27th Governor of Hong Kong
Tim Yeo, UK Conservative Party politician
Sir Edward Youde, 26th Governor of Hong Kong
Bo Bo Nge, Burmese economist, vice governor of the Central Bank of Myanmar, and political prisoner

Media/writers

Desi Anwar, journalist and presenter, Metro TV, Jakarta, Indonesia
Abdel Bari Atwan, journalist, editor-in-chief of Al-Quds Al-Arabi newspaper in London
Zeinab Badawi, journalist and presenter
Peter Barakan, broadcaster
Fatima Bhutto, author and journalist
Martin Bright, journalist, political editor of the Jewish Chronicle
Jason Chan Chi-san, actor and television presenter
Jung Chang, writer
Chris Crudelli, author and BBC television broadcaster
Swapan Dasgupta, political analyst, journalist, columnist
Hossein Derakhshan, Iranian blogger credited with starting the blogging revolution in Iran
Jamal Elshayyal, news producer at Al Jazeera English
Ghida Fakhry, journalist and news anchor at Al Jazeera English
Faris Glubb, son of Glubb Pasha, activist, author and journalist
James Harding, journalist, former editor of The Times
Aidan Hartley, author and journalist
Lindsey Hilsum, Channel 4 News correspondent and columnist for the New Statesman
Dom Joly, television comedian and journalist
 Elan Journo, Fellow and Director of Policy Research at the Ayn Rand Institute, author, and journalist
Sabiha Al Khemir, Tunisian writer and expert in Islamic art
Clive King, author
Emma Larkin, American author
Richard Mason, novelist
Rabindra Mishra, editor, BBC Nepali Service
Khyentse Norbu, filmmaker and Tibetan Buddhist Lama
Taimur Rahman, Member CentComm Communist Mazdoor Kissan Party
Andrew Robinson, author and journalist
Tom Rogan, journalist
Gita Sahgal, writer and journalist, film director, and human rights activist
Saira Shah, journalist and filmmaker
Freya Stark, travel writer
Christopher Sykes, author
Sherine Tadros, al Jazeera English correspondent
Rupert Wingfield-Hayes, journalist and broadcaster

Academics

Hakim Adi, historian and scholar specializing in African affairs
Michael Vaillancourt Aris, Historian
Suniti Kumar Chattopadhyay, considered to be the greatest Bengali linguist and grammarian 
Sushil Kumar De, Indian polymath and author
Mario Aguilar, Oromo scholar and theologian
Akbar Ahmed, author, diplomat and scholar of contemporary Islam
Ali Ansari, historian, Iran expert, professor
Amira Bennison, historian of the Middle East
Charles Otto Blagden, linguist
Issa J. Boullata, Arabic literature and Qur'anic studies,
Urvashi Butalia, historian, feminist, founder and director of Kali for Women
Hazel Carter (linguist), Linguist, known for her work on the Bantu languages, Shona, Kongo and Tonga. 
Gus Casely-Hayford, curator, cultural historian
K.N. Chaudhuri, historian, author, creative writer, and graphic artist
George N. Clements, linguist
Craig Clunas, art historian, Professor of History of Art at the University of Oxford
Hugh E. Conway, American economist and college professor
Simon Digby, oriental scholar
Frank Dikötter, Dutch historian
Ronald P. Dore, sociologist
Diana L. Eck, comparative religion and Indian Studies
Dafydd Fell, British political scientist writing extensively on politics of Taiwan.
Antony Flew, philosopher
David SG Goodman, scholar of contemporary China
Wang Gungwu, Chinese historian
Sir Martin Harris, educationalist
Fred Halliday, historian, international relations
Ian Hancock, linguist and Romani scholar
Betty Heimann, Indologist
Anthony Hyman, academic, writer and Islamicist
Robert Graham Irwin, historian and writer on Arabic literature
Marsden Jones, Islamic scholar
Samten Karmay, Tibetologist, expert on Bon religion, CNRS
Kusuma Karunaratne, Sinhalese language and literature
Nick Knight, Professor of Asian Studies
Gregory B. Lee, Professor of Chinese Studies at the University of St Andrews
Trevor LeGassick, Professor of Arabic Literature at University of Michigan
Bernard Lewis, Islamic scholar and Emeritus Professor at Princeton University, USA
Victor Lieberman, Southeast Asian historian
Martin Lings, English Muslim scholar and author
Michael Loewe, sinologist
David Neil MacKenzie, scholar of Iranian languages
Victor Mair, sinologist
Nur Masalha, author, historian, editor and Middle East scholar
Duncan McCargo, Southeast Asian Politics
Syed Muhammad Naquib al-Attas, philosopher
Ian Nish, Japanese studies
Farish Noor, academic, historian specialised in Southeast Asian region
Ben Pimlott, historian, biographer
Susan Oosthuizen, Emeritus Professor of Medieval Archaeology at the University of Cambridge
Martin Orwin, author, scholar, and poet
James R. Russell, Armenian Studies
Kamal Salibi, Lebanese historian and professor
Tsering Shakya historian and Tibetologist
Ram Sharan Sharmam historian of Ancient India
Alireza Shapour Shahbazi, prominent Persian archaeologist, Iranologist, world expert on Achaemenid archaeology
Ninian Smart, religious studies
Patrick Sookhdeo, theologian and Anglican canon
Isolde Standish, Film theorist specialised in East Asia
Romila Thapar, Indian historian
Farouk Topan, director of the Swahili Centre at the Aga Khan University
Thomas Trautmann, historian
Konrad Tuchscherer, historian
Than Tun, historian of Burma
Andrew Turton, anthropologist, specialised on Thailand and Tai peoples
Giles Ji Ungpakorn, former university lecturer at Chulalongkorn University
Ivan van Sertima, historian and anthropologist, professor of African studies at Rutgers University
William Montgomery Watt, historian and Islamic scholar
Timothy J. Winter, aka Abdul Hakim Murad, Islamic scholar, author and teacher
Ehsan Yarshater, Iranian studies
Rosemarie Said Zahlan, historian, writer on the Persian Gulf states
Syed Muhammad Naquib al-Attas, prominent contemporary Muslim philosopher and thinker from Malaysia

Music and the arts

Khyam Allami, musician, oud player
M. K. Asante, Jr., writer and filmmaker
Thurston Clarke, writer
Raman Mundair, writer, artist, poet and playwright
Olu Oguibe, artist and academic
Derwin Panda, musician and producer
Paul Robeson, musician, writer and civil rights activist
Himanshu Suri aka "Heems", rapper, member of Das Racist
Gareth Williams, musician, member of This Heat
Cheng Yu, musician
Jason Chan, Actor and Television Presenter
Dom Joly, writer, comedian and former diplomat

Business and finance
Fred Eychaner, American businessman, philanthropist
Abdulsalam Haykal, CEO of Transtek Systems, CEO of Haykal Media, publisher of Aliqtisadi, and Forward Magazine
Sir Joseph Hotung, businessman, art collector, and philanthropist
Lesetja Kganyago, Governor of the South African Reserve Bank
Peter Parker, chairman of the British Railways Board
Atiur Rahman, Governor of Bangladesh Bank, the central bank of the country
Sir Dermot de Trafford, banker, businessman and aristocrat
Ariel Reid, property consultant and lifestyle influencer

Religion

Mirza Tahir Ahmad, fourth khalifa of the Worldwide Ahmadiyya Muslim Community
Andrew Bertie, Grand Master of the Sovereign Military Order of Malta, and distant relative of Queen Elizabeth II.
Michael L. Fitzgerald, President of the Pontifical Council for Interreligious Dialogue 2002–2006, Apostolic Nuncio to Egypt (from 2006)
Maurice Noël Léon Couve de Murville, Archbishop of Birmingham 1982–1999
Sheikh Abdul Qayum, scholar and Chief Imam of the East London Mosque
Hammalawa Saddhatissa, Buddhist Monk of Sri Lanka
David Young, Bishop of Ripon 1977–1999

Others
 Sir Hamish Forbes, Bt, British Army officer
 Ngozi Fulani, educator and women's rights advocate
 Maro Itoje, England rugby union international (current student)
 Agha Haris Khan (Durrani),  Pakistani Lawyer and Model
 Samantha Lewthwaite, alleged mastermind of the Westgate shopping mall attack and widow to 7 July 2005 London bombings perpetrator Germaine Lindsay. Currently wanted by INTERPOL and Kenyan authorities.
 Margarita Moran-Floirendo, Miss Universe 1973 representing the Philippines
 Sarina Prabasi, CEO of WaterAid America
 Josh Carrott, Youtuber
 Gordan Lonsdale, Soviet Spy
 William Montgomery McGovern, Inspiration for the character Indiana Jones

Notable faculty and staff

Faculty of Law and Social Sciences
Gilbert Achcar, Globalisation
Gunnar Beck, EU lawyer and Member of the European Parliament (MEP). 
Malcolm Caldwell, Southeast Asian Economic History
Ben Fine, Economics
Mushtaq Khan, Economics
Laleh Khalili, Middle East Politics
Alfredo Saad-Filho,  Marxian economist
Guy Standing, Economics
Philip Stott, Biogeography
Charles R. H. Tripp, Middle East Politics

Faculty of Arts and Humanities

Arthur Llewellyn Basham, Indian History
K.N. Chaudhuri, Indian History
Michael Cook, Islamic History
Patricia Crone, Islamic History
Lucy Durán, African Music
Nelida Fuccaro, Middle Eastern History
William Hale (professor), Turkey and Turkish politics
D. G. E. Hall, History of South East Asia
Gerald Hawting, History of the Near Middle East
Dick Hodder, geographer 
Jung Chang, writer and historian, author of Wild Swans
Nasser David Khalili, Islamic Art
Roland Oliver, African History
Alexander Piatigorsky, History of South Asia
Timon Screech, Japanese art, architecture and history
R. G. Tiedemann, historian of Christianity in China
Andrew Turton, anthropology and South East Asian studies
John Wansbrough, Islamic History

Faculty of Languages and Cultures

Muhammad Abdel-Haleem, Islamic Studies
Shirin Akiner, Central Asian Studies
David Appleyard, Languages of the Horn of Africa
Arthur John Arberry, Persian Studies
Charles Bawden, Mongolian Studies
Mary Boyce, Iranian Studies
J. Percy Bruce, Chinese
Monik Charette, linguist and phonologist 
Evangeline Edwards, Chinese language and literature
John Rupert Firth, Linguistics
Sir Hamilton Gibb, Orientalist
Angus Charles Graham, Classical Chinese
Alfred Guillaume, Islamic Studies
Walter Bruno Henning, Iranian Studies
Michel Hockx, China and Inner Asia Studies
Reginald Johnston, Chinese language and literature
Hugh N. Kennedy, Arabic
Philip G. Kreyenbroek, Iranian studies
Ann Lambton, Iranian Studies
Wendy Doniger O'Flaherty, Indian religion
Patrick Geoffrey O'Neill, Japanese
Soe Tjen Marching, academic, activist, and a composer of avant-garde music from Indonesia
Vladimir Minorsky, Iranian Studies
David Marshall Lang, Caucasian Studies
Bernard Lewis, Middle East Studies
John Ralston Marr, South Asian Studies
Tudor Parfitt Modern Jewish Studies
Xiao Qian, China and Inner Asia Studies
William Radice, Bengali language and literature
Christopher Reynolds, Dhivehi and Sinhala language
Ralph Russell, Urdu language and literature
Christopher Shackle, Languages and Cultures of Northwest India
Nicholas Sims-Williams, Iranian and Central Asian Studies
David Snellgrove, Tibetan Studies
Arthur Stanley Tritton, Arabic language and literature
Kenneth Strong, Japanese
Paul Thompson, Classical Chinese
Edward Ullendorff, Ethiopian Studies and Semitic Languages
Arthur Waley, Japan and China Studies
Richard Olaf Winstedt, Malay language and literature

References

External links
SOAS Alumni

 
SOAS